Redhill School is a coeducational secondary school with academy status, located in Stourbridge, West Midlands (formerly Worcestershire), England.

It has no sixth form, similar to most schools in the Borough of Dudley, and all schools in Stourbridge. It is situated just east of the single-track Stourbridge Town Branch Line.

History
It was formed in September 1976, when Stourbridge Boys' Grammar School and Stourbridge Girls' High School in the town centre merged with Lye Secondary Modern School in the Lye area. These former schools were administered by Worcestershire Education Committee until 1974.

The new school was located entirely at the grammar and high school sites on Redhill, near Stourbridge town centre on either side of Junction Road, with the Lye building being converted to a community centre.

Jamie Clayton has been Headteacher of Redhill since 2019, replacing Chris McGrail.

The school gained specialist Language College status in 2003 before converting to an academy in July 2013.

Teacher Ban in 2020 
In 2020 a former teacher at the school received an indefinite ban on teaching, having admitted dishonesty related to submitting pupils' work to exam boards.

Building 
The original building is known as ‘A block’  has been extensively refurbished and a number of other buildings added to the site. The Music Centre is known as ‘B block’,  The Humanities, and Creative Technology learning areas are on the other side of Junction Road in ‘C block’.  Next to this building is the science centre, the Sports Development Centre, sports hall and gym.

Redhill School has a proprietary Sports Pitch for playing Football, known by Pupils as the ‘Rubber Crumb’ as it contains small pieces of rubber in it.

Uniform 
Redhill let their Pupils choose what colour shirt they want to wear, these are Blue or White. The Tie of Redhill is a Blue and Green slanted tie.

References

External links
 Redhill School official website

Secondary schools in the Metropolitan Borough of Dudley
Stourbridge
Educational institutions established in 1976
1976 establishments in England
Academies in the Metropolitan Borough of Dudley